Van Aaken is a surname. Notable people with the surname include:

Anne van Aaken (born 1969), German lawyer and economist
Ernst van Aaken (1910–1984), German sports physician and athletics trainer

See also
Van Aken
Van Auken (disambiguation)